Gilford Motor Co Ltd v Horne [1933] Ch 935 is a UK company law case concerning piercing the corporate veil. It gives an example of when courts will treat shareholders and a company as one, in a situation where a company is used as an instrument of fraud.

Facts
Mr EB Horne was formerly a managing director of the Gilford Motor Co Ltd. His employment contract stipulated (clause 9) not to solicit customers of the company if he were to leave employment of Gilford Motor Co. Mr. Horne was fired, thereafter he set up his own business and undercut Gilford Motor Co's prices. He received legal advice saying that he was probably acting in breach of contract. So he set up a company, JM Horne & Co Ltd, in which his wife and a friend called Mr Howard were the sole shareholders and directors. They took over Horne’s business and continued it. Mr. Horne sent out fliers saying,

The company had no such agreement with Gilford Motor about not competing, however Gilford Motor brought an action alleging that the company was used as an instrument of fraud to conceal Mr Horne's illegitimate actions.

Judgment

High Court
Farwell J held that the covenant Mr Horne would not compete was broken. ‘I cannot help feeling quite convinced that at any rate one of the reasons for the creation of that company was the fear of Mr Horne that he might commit breaches of the covenant in carrying on the business…’ But because the covenant was too wide and against public policy (restraint of trade?) he refused to enforce it. Gilford Motor appealed.

Court of Appeal
Lord Hanworth MR granted an injunction, so that Horne was forced to stop competing through the company.

Lawrence LJ and Romer LJ concurred.

See also

Jones v Lipman

References

United Kingdom company case law
United Kingdom corporate personality case law
Court of Appeal (England and Wales) cases
1933 in case law
1933 in British law